I Predict 1990 is the title of the fourth release and third full-length album by singer-songwriter Steve Taylor. Lyrically, the album explores actions that exploit others to various ends from multiple perspectives. CCM magazine found that the overall theme is that the ends never justify the means. It was released as a one-off on Myrrh Records instead of Sparrow. Taylor has said that the album's title was meant as a parody of a Lester Sumrall TV program and book, I Predict 1986.

Background
The cover was designed and painted by Taylor's wife, Debi. It was intended to resemble early 20th-century French poster art; however some Christians felt that it resembled a tarot card, which sparked controversy. Additionally, one televangelist claimed that the image was of Taylor saluting Satan, and that it additionally contained secret messages and links to New Age philosophy. These accusations caused some Christian book stores to pull the album.

Per the album's credits, all songs were written by Steve Taylor, except "Babylon" by Taylor and Dave Perkins. The ending theme to "Jim Morrison's Grave" was "borrowed" from Claude Debussy; and the introduction to "Harder to Believe" was "stolen" from Sergei Rachmaninoff.

The song "I Blew Up the Clinic Real Good" proved controversial; The song's lyrics - a scathing critique of anti-abortion activists who in turn blow up abortion clinics or kill doctors - resulted in Christian bookstores pulling the album, either because the song's critique of the anti-abortion movement offended store owners and customers, or because these same individuals missed the song's satirical point, and believed Taylor advocated such violence. Taylor himself would occasionally call these stores to personally explain the song to them. Taylor's tour of Australia was canceled due to the controversy around "I Blew Up The Clinic Real Good", largely due to misunderstanding of its satire.

Disillusioned with the Christian music scene following these and other controversies during the course of his career, Taylor formed the secular alternative rock band Chagall Guevara shortly after the release of the album.

Track listing
 "I Blew Up the Clinic Real Good" - 4:12
 "What Is the Measure of Your Success?" - 4:39
 "Since I Gave Up Hope I Feel a Lot Better" - 3:29
 "Babylon" - 4:51
 "Jim Morrison's Grave" - 4:29
 "Svengali" - 4:30
 "Jung and the Restless" - 4:32
 "Innocence Lost" - 5:03
 "A Principled Man" - 3:27
 "Harder to Believe Than Not To" - 4:32

Personnel 
Some Band
 Steve Taylor – vocals and backup percussion
 Dave Thrush – saxophones
 Jeff Stone – guitar
 Glen Holmen – bass
 Jack Kelly – drums
 Steve Goomas – keyboards
 Gym Nicholson – guitar

Additional musicians
 Dave Perkins – additional guitar on all songs except "Jim Morrison's Grave" and "Harder to Believe"
 Greg Husted – assorted keyboard tracks and accordion
 Papa John Creach – fiddle
 Ashley Cleveland – vocal stylings on "Jim Morrison's Grave", "Svengali" and "Babylon"
 Annie McCaig – backing vocals on "Success" and "A Principled Man"
 Nathan East - bass on "Clinic"
 Gary Lunn – bass on "Hope"
 Lisa Cates – percussion
 Mike Mead – more percussion
 Mary Bates – operatic vocal on "Harder to Believe"
 Jim Horn – tenor saxophone on "Clinic"
 Ross Holmen – French horn
 John Andrew Schreiner – synth bass on "Svengali"
 Janet Croninger – "Jung" woman
 Fred Travalena – "Jung" doctor
 Del Newman – orchestration on "Harder to Believe Than Not To"

Production notes
 The Beaufort Twins (Dave Perkins and Steve Taylor) - producers and engineers
 Dave Perkins - producer, engineer, mixing
 Steve Taylor - producer, mixing
 David Schober - engineer
 Malcolm Harper - engineer
 Robert Wartinbee - assistant engineer
 Michael Ross - engineer on "Harder To Believe"
 Music Grinder, Los Angeles, California - recording location
 Reelsound Bus, Nashville, Tennessee - recording location
 Wayne Cook Studios, Los Angeles, California - recording location
 CBS Studios, London - recording location
 Reelsound truck, Austin, Texas (48 track) - mixing location
 Bob Ludwig - mastering
 Masterdisk, New York, New York - mastering location

 Dave Perkins and Steve Taylor are listed as producers as "The Beaufort Twins."  A likely satire of the  Mick Jagger & Keith Richards production/songwriting partnership billed as The Glimmer Twins

References

1987 albums
Steve Taylor albums